Theresa Anne Villiers (born 5 March 1968) is a British politician who has served as the Member of Parliament (MP) for Chipping Barnet since 2005, having previously served as a Member of the European Parliament from 1999 to 2005. A member of the Conservative Party, Villiers was Minister of State for Rail and Aviation from 2010 to 2012, Secretary of State for Northern Ireland from 2012 to 2016 and Secretary of State for Environment, Food and Rural Affairs from 2019 to 2020.

Early life
Villiers was born in Hunstanton, Norfolk in 1968, the third child of George Edward Villiers by his marriage to Anne Virginia Threlfall; she has two elder brothers, Edward and Henry. On her father's side, she is a descendant of Edward Ernest Villiers (1806–1843), brother of George Villiers, 4th Earl of Clarendon, Thomas Hyde Villiers, Charles Pelham Villiers, and Henry Montagu Villiers and a direct descendant of King Edward II.

Growing up in North London, she was educated at the independent Francis Holland School. Villiers gained a Bachelor of Laws (LLB) degree with first-class honours in 1990 from the University of Bristol, and a year later the postgraduate degree of Bachelor of Civil Law (BCL) from Jesus College, Oxford. After university, she qualified for the bar at the Inner Temple, and worked as a lecturer at King's College London from 1994 until 1999.

Member of the European Parliament
Villiers was elected as a Member of the European Parliament (MEP) for the London constituency in 1999, and was re-elected in 2004. She stood down after the 2005 general election when she was elected as the Member of Parliament (MP) for Chipping Barnet.

She served as Deputy Leader of the Conservatives in the European Parliament between 2001 and 2002. She also served as a member of the governing board of the Conservative Party during this period.

Member of Parliament
In 2003, following Sir Sydney Chapman's announcement that he would retire at the following election, Villiers was selected as the Conservative prospective parliamentary candidate for Chipping Barnet. Although Chapman's majority at the 2001 general election had only been 2,701 votes, the party viewed Chipping Barnet to be quite a "safe" Conservative seat, and Villiers held it at the 2005 general election with an increased majority of 5,960 votes, which she increased again to 11,927 in 2010. Her majority dropped to 7,656 in 2015, and was reduced to just 353 in 2017. However, Villiers' majority rose to 1,212 in the 2019 general election, despite her percentage share of the vote going down slightly.

Upon her election to the House of Commons in 2005, she resigned from her seat in the European Parliament; it went to Syed Kamall, the next candidate on the Conservatives' regional list for London. Villiers now lives at Arkley in her constituency, and formerly lived at Hillsborough Castle.

Villiers was sworn of the Privy Council on 9 June 2010.

In July 2021, Villiers was one of five Conservative MPs found by the Commons Select Committee on Standards to have breached the code of conduct by trying to influence a judge in the trial of former Conservative MP Charlie Elphicke, who was eventually found guilty of three counts of sexual assault and sentenced to two years in prison. Villiers was one of three of the group recommended for a one-day suspension by the committee.

Shadow Cabinet
In December 2005, following the election of David Cameron as Conservative Party Leader, Villiers was promoted to the Shadow Cabinet, as Shadow Chief Secretary to the Treasury. In July 2007, Cameron promoted her to Shadow Secretary of State for Transport.

Government

Following the 2010 general election, the Conservatives, short of an overall majority, formed a coalition government with the Liberal Democrats. This required positions in Cabinet to be awarded to Lib Dem MPs, so Villiers did not become Secretary of State for Transport as might have been expected in the event of a majority Conservative government taking office. That role went instead to Philip Hammond, who had shadowed the post of Chief Secretary to the Treasury. Villiers instead became a Minister of State at the Department for Transport.

Villiers was appointed Secretary of State for Northern Ireland in September 2012. Her time in Northern Ireland gained mixed reviews. She made a speech in February 2016 defending the Royal Ulster Constabulary and the British Army, which had been accused of colluding with loyalist murderers in the Loughinisland massacre. The Police Ombudsman who investigated the murders, Dr. Michael Maguire, later stated with regard to law enforcement authorities colluding with the murderers: "I have no hesitation in unambiguously determining that collusion is a significant feature of the Loughinisland murders".

Villiers had said that "a pernicious counter-narrative" of the Troubles was emerging whereby responsibility for acts of terrorism was being shifted onto the security forces "through allegations of collusion, misuse of agents and informers or other forms of unlawful activity".

Villiers was one of the six cabinet ministers who came out in support of Brexit during the 2016 United Kingdom European Union membership referendum. As the Secretary of State for Northern Ireland at the time, she was pressed to explain her view of the problems her position could cause the province. In April 2016, she gave a speech saying those raising concerns about Brexit's impact on Northern Ireland were "scaremongering". Following the referendum, on 14 July 2016, Villiers resigned from her position as Northern Ireland Secretary after stating that new Prime Minister Theresa May had offered her a post in the Cabinet which was "not one which I felt I could take on".
During the referendum, 62.2% of voters in her constituency (based on a 72.1% turnout), voted to remain in the European Union. After the referendum, Villiers continued to support leaving the EU.

Villiers was appointed Secretary of State for Environment, Food and Rural Affairs by Boris Johnson upon him becoming Prime Minister in July 2019. She left the government in the post-Brexit cabinet reshuffle.

In June 2020 The Times newspaper reported that the delay in the formation of the Intelligence and Security Committee of Parliament since the 2019 United Kingdom general election had been due to Villiers appointment having been dismissed by the Prime Minister for her defiance of the Government's whip on a vote where she supported an amendment which would have banned the import of chlorinated chicken products from the US in upcoming post-Brexit trade negotiations.

Parliamentary expenses and second home
She also has a house in Arkley in her North London constituency of Chipping Barnet. The house, a semi-detached property that she bought for £296,500 in May 2004, is an eight-minute drive away from High Barnet tube station, from which commuters can reach Westminster in about forty-five minutes.

Political opinions
Villiers supported the temporary suspension of Ken Livingstone, then-Mayor of London, by the Adjudication Panel for England, which examined the case after a complaint from the Board of Deputies of British Jews to the Standards Board for England.

Theresa Villiers is a member, and since 2017 Vice-Chair, of Conservative Friends of Israel.

On 19 July 2018 she was the only MP of any party to attend a rally of about 200–300 Jewish and other persons called by the "Campaign Against Antisemitism" (CAA) in Parliament Square, London, to protest against Jeremy Corbyn and the Labour Party.  She has, on previous occasions, attended CAA protests similar to that of 19 July 2018 against anti-semitism within Labour.

She spoke out publicly in support of Iranian resistance to the Iranian regime at an event in Paris in 2017, organised by the National Council of Resistance of Iran. The NCRI is considered by some analysts to be a front organisation for the Mojahedin-e-Khalq (MEK), which was once listed by the US as a terror organisation.

Since September 2008, Villiers has dedicated a considerable proportion of her public announcements to aviation policy, specifically the expansion of airports in the South East of England. Villiers underlined that despite differences of opinion, the Coalition government's policy was opposed to a third runway at Heathrow airport.

She has also spoken out against Boris Johnson's favoured proposal for a new London airport to be built in the Thames Estuary, and alternative expansions at Gatwick and Stansted airports, arguing that airlines should make greater use of the UK's regional airports, though some regional airports themselves have expressed concern about being adversely affected by capacity shortages in the South East. Villiers favours construction of a high-speed rail link from London to Birmingham and Manchester, arguing that flyers could use capacity at airports such as Birmingham International and Manchester International Airport.

In May 2017, Villiers announced that she fundamentally supports the ban on hunting of wild animals with dogs but suggested that there remains scope for reform of the Hunting Act 2004.

In September 2019 at that year's Conservative Party Conference, Villiers set out plans to end live exports of farm animals, ban primates from being kept as pets and for cats to be microchipped.

Personal life
Villiers married fellow barrister Sean Wilken KC in 1997,  and the following year they co-wrote a book on matters of contract and quasi-contract law, which was published by a major publishing house. They are now divorced.

Publications

References

External links

 

|-

|-

|-

|-

|-

|-

1968 births
Living people
Academics of King's College London
Alumni of Jesus College, Oxford
Alumni of the University of Bristol
British Secretaries of State for the Environment
Female members of the Cabinet of the United Kingdom
Female members of the Parliament of the United Kingdom for English constituencies
Conservative Party (UK) MPs for English constituencies
Members of the Inner Temple
Members of the Privy Council of the United Kingdom
MEPs for England 1999–2004
MEPs for England 2004–2009
20th-century women MEPs for England
21st-century women MEPs for England
People educated at Francis Holland School
People from Hunstanton
Politicians from Norfolk, East Anglia
Secretaries of State for Northern Ireland
UK MPs 2005–2010
UK MPs 2010–2015
UK MPs 2015–2017
UK MPs 2017–2019
UK MPs 2019–present
Theresa
British Eurosceptics